Littleton is an unincorporated community in Sussex County, Virginia, United States.

Little Town was listed on the National Register of Historic Places in 1976.

References

Unincorporated communities in Sussex County, Virginia
Unincorporated communities in Virginia